Collagen alpha-5(IV) chain is a protein that in humans is encoded by the COL4A5 gene.

This gene encodes one of the six subunits of type IV collagen, the major structural component of basement membranes. Mutations in this gene are associated with X-linked Alport syndrome, also known as hereditary nephritis. Like the other members of the type IV collagen gene family, this gene is organized in a head-to-head conformation with another type IV collagen gene so that each gene pair shares a common promoter. Three transcript variants have been identified for this gene.

Disease Databases
ARUP COL4A5 gene variant database

LOVD Alport gene variant databases (COL4A5, COL4A3, COL4A4)

See also
 Collagen
 Type-IV collagen
 Alport syndrome

References

Further reading

Collagens